Cuddle + kind is a doll manufacturing company started in 2015 that produces handmade dolls for children. It was founded by Jennifer Woodgate and her husband, Derek. The dolls are made by artisans in Peru and offers them a fair trade wage.  Each doll has a name, a story and a birth date attached to it and the company has the goal of providing one million meals a year to hungry children. They have paired with the World Food Programme, pledging that they will provide at least 10 meals to children in need through the World Food Program USA and other programs for every doll purchased.  As of July 2018, they have donated four millions meals to kids in need. In 2016, they received the Oppenheim Toy Portfolio Best Toy Award. In 2018, they won the National Parenting Products Awards.  Stars including Jessica Alba and Gwyneth Paltrow have selected the dolls as their best gift ideas, as have Fox 5, ABC News, Bustle,  People magazine, Mashable and Upworthy.

References 

Doll manufacturing companies
Toy companies established in 2015
Toy companies of the United States
American companies established in 2015